VMW may refer to:
 ISO 639:vmw, the ISO 639-3 code for the Makhuwa language
 VMware, the New York Stock Exchange code VMW
 VMW (radio station)